The D. A. Dorsey House is the historic home of D. A. Dorsey in Miami, Florida. It is located at 250 Northwest Ninth Street. On January 4, 1989, it was added to the U.S. National Register of Historic Places.

References

External links

 Dade County listings at National Register of Historic Places
 Dade County listings at Florida's Office of Cultural and Historical Programs

African-American history in Miami
Houses on the National Register of Historic Places in Florida
National Register of Historic Places in Miami
Houses in Miami